For other articles titled George Payne, see George Payne (disambiguation).

George Washington Payne was a Major League Baseball pitcher.

Payne had a long career in the minor leagues, spanning twenty-eight years.

He pitched in the Texas League for the Wichita Falls Spudders (1927–1929) and Houston Buffaloes (1930–1934).

External links

Major League Baseball pitchers
Chicago White Sox players
Charleston Sea Gulls players
Brunswick Pilots players
Binghamton Bingoes players
Warren Bingoes players
Des Moines Boosters players
Marshalltown Ansons players
Nashville Vols players
Little Rock Travelers players
Oklahoma City Indians players
Los Angeles Angels (minor league) players
Portland Beavers players
Wichita Falls Spudders players
Houston Buffaloes players
Indianapolis Indians players
Springfield Cardinals players
Decatur Commodores players
Columbus Red Birds players
Worthington Cardinals players
Minor league baseball managers
Baseball players from Kentucky
1889 births
1959 deaths
People from Rockcastle County, Kentucky